Moncrabeau is a commune in the Lot-et-Garonne department in south-western France.

Moncrabeau is located on the Petite Baïse river, close to the D930.

See also
Communes of the Lot-et-Garonne department

References

Communes of Lot-et-Garonne